Eric Bostrom (born November 19, 1976, in San Francisco, California) is an American professional motorcycle racer and brother of Ben Bostrom, who also races motorcycles professionally.

He is currently racing in the AMA Superbike series for Attack Kawasaki, but he is better known for being a member of the Austin Ducati and Parts Unlimited Ducati teams in 2004 and 2005, and perhaps best known for riding for the factory Kawasaki team from 1999 to 2003.  Bostrom raced for Erion Honda in 1998 and Zero Gravity Racing in 1997.

Statistically, Bostrom's best season was the 2001 season.  Riding for Kawasaki, he finished a close 2nd to Mat Mladin in the AMA Superbike series and won the AMA Supersport Championship.

Timeline
Bostrom won the Progressive Insurance Harley-Davidson SuperTwins Championship in 1997, winning 10 of the 11 series races.

Bostrom's AMA Superbike career began in 1998 when he replaced the injured Miguel Duhamel on the Erion Honda, winning his 2nd and 3rd races in the class. He was entered in several Superbike World Championship races as well.  Bostrom also won the AMA Formula Xtreme Championship in 1998 riding for the Erion Honda team.

Bostrom raced for Kawasaki from 1999 to 2003 riding the ZX-7R in the AMA Superbike Championship.  He also rode the ZX-6R in the AMA Supersport Championship, winning the AMA Supersport championship in 2001.  In 2001, Bostrom finished second in the AMA Superbike Championship to Mat Mladin.  He also finished second in the AMA Superbike Championship in 2002, this time behind Nicky Hayden.  During his career at Kawasaki, Bostrom was able to compete in several World Superbike events.  This, coupled with his back-to-back second-place finishes in AMA's highest class lead many observers to believe a transfer to World Superbike, or possibly MotoGP was in Bostrom's future.  Injuries marred his 2003 season and Kawasaki pulled out of AMA competitions.

Bostrom rode the Austin Ducati in the AMA Superbike Championship in 2004 and the Parts Unlimited Ducati in 2005.  He was the sole AMA Superbike Ducati rider in 2004.  Former Superbike World Champion Neil Hodgson joined the Parts Unlimited Ducati AMA Superbike team for the 2005 season.  Bostrom's brother, Ben, took his spot on the Ducati team after Eric left for Yamaha after the 2005 season ended.  By the end of the 2006 season, Ducati pulled out of all AMA competitions.

Bostrom joined the factory Yamaha team before the 2006 season to ride in the AMA Supersport Championship and AMA Formula Xtreme Championship.  His factory Yamaha teammate was Jason DiSalvo.  For the 2007 and 2008 seasons, Bostrom rode for Yamaha, competing in AMA Superbike riding and developing the Yamaha YZF-R1 Superbike alongside DiSalvo.

Bostrom did not race motorcycles professionally during 2009.

During 2010 Bostrom rode part-time in the AMA Daytona Sportbike and Superbike classes for Cycle World Attack Performance Yoshimura Suzuki.

In July 2012, Bostrom raced for Team Icon Brammo at the TTXGP FIM e-Power race at Mazda Raceway Laguna Seca, riding the Brammo Empulse RR electric motorcycle.

Superbike World Championship
Bostrom has also raced in the Superbike World Championship, usually as a wildcard entry in the United States rounds at Laguna Seca. In  he finished 10th and 7th, and in  he finished fifth twice. In the  season, Bostrom was entered at five meetings as a third rider in the Kawasaki World Superbike team, with his best results being 6th and 4th in the US.

Eric and his brothers are also very engaged with 2Wheel Tuner, a leading magazine editorial based around the Sportbike community. Each month they write an article entitled "Boz Bros Chronicles" which follows their travels from racing to 24hr mountain bike races and their trips around the world.

Career statistics
2013 - 1st in FIM eRoad Racing World Cup (American Series)
2008 - 4th in AMA Superbike Championship
2007 - 7th in AMA Superbike Championship
2006 - 2nd in AMA Formula Xtreme Championship
2005 - 3rd in AMA Superbike Championship
2004 - 4th in AMA Superbike Championship
2003 - 7th in AMA Superbike Championship
2002 - 2nd in AMA Superbike Championship
2001 - 1st in AMA Supersport Championship
2001 - 2nd in AMA Superbike Championship
2000 - 2nd in AMA Supersport Championship
2000 - 4th in AMA Superbike Championship
1999 - 7th in AMA Superbike Championship
1999 - 9th in AMA Supersport Championship
1998 - 1st in AMA Formula Xtreme Championship
1998 - 3rd in AMA Supersport Championship
1997 - 1st in AMA Super twins Series
1996 - 1st in AMA Harley-Davidson 883 Dirt Track

References

External links
Announcement that Bostrom will not ride in 2009.
Official Bostrom Brothers site
Eric Bostrom  profile at AMAProRacing.com
https://web.archive.org/web/20070930230615/http://www.the-doesman.nl/bikestuff/ebostrom-nl.htm
RoadRacerX interview March 7, 2007
Motorcycle USA Laguna Seca report  July 16, 2003
The Boz Bros Personal Sportbikeclub.com page.

1976 births
Living people
AMA Superbike Championship riders
Superbike World Championship riders
American motorcycle racers